Diego Augusto Teixeira Alves (born 17 May 1991), known as Diego Augusto or simply Diego, is a Brazilian footballer who plays for Tupynambás as a central defender.

Career
Born in São Paulo, Diego graduated from Portuguesa's youth categories, and made his first team debut on 26 November 2011, playing the last 13 minutes of a 2–0 away win over Icasa for the Série B championship. He made his Série A debut on 8 July of the following year, starting in a 0–2 away loss against Atlético Mineiro.

Diego left Lusa in December 2014, and signed for Ituano on 5 January 2015.

Honours
Portuguesa
Campeonato Brasileiro Série B: 2011
Campeonato Paulista Série A2: 2013

References

External links
 

1991 births
Living people
Footballers from São Paulo
Brazilian footballers
Association football defenders
Campeonato Brasileiro Série A players
Campeonato Brasileiro Série B players
Associação Portuguesa de Desportos players
Ituano FC players
Ypiranga Futebol Clube players
Associação Atlética Anapolina players
Sertãozinho Futebol Clube players
Rio Claro Futebol Clube players
Tupynambás Futebol Clube players